The Lodge Bill of 1890, also referred to as the Federal Elections Bill or by critics as the Lodge Force Bill, was a proposed bill to ensure the security of elections for U.S. Representatives.

It was drafted and proposed by Representative Henry Cabot Lodge of Massachusetts and sponsored in the Senate by George Frisbie Hoar with the endorsement of President Benjamin Harrison and all Republicans. The bill provided for the federal regulation of elections to the United States House of Representatives, where had heretofore been regulated by state governments. In particular, the bill would have permitted federal circuit courts (upon a petition by 500 citizens from any district) to appoint federal supervisors for congressional elections. Supervisors would have the power to attend elections, inspect registration lists, verify doubtful voter information, administer oaths to challenged voters, stop illegal aliens from voting, and certify the vote count. Perhaps most controversially, the supervisor would have the power to request Deputy United States Marshals to secure elections by force if deemed necessary.

The bill was created primarily to enforce the ability of blacks, predominantly Republican at the time, to vote in the Southern United States, as provided for in the constitution. The Fifteenth Amendment already formally guaranteed that right, but white southern Democrats had passed laws related to voter registration and electoral requirements, such as requiring payment of poll taxes and literacy tests (often waived if the prospective voter's grandfather had been a registered voter, the "grandfather clause"), that effectively prevented blacks from voting.  That year Mississippi passed a new constitution that disfranchised most blacks, and other states would soon follow the "Mississippi plan".

After passing the House by just six votes, the Lodge bill was successfully filibustered in the Senate, with little action by the President of the Senate, Vice President Levi P. Morton, because Silver Republicans in the West traded it away for Southern support of the Sherman Silver Purchase Act and Northern Republicans traded it away for Southern support of the McKinley Tariff.

Background 

The 15th Amendment to the US Constitution states: “The right of citizens of the United States to vote shall not be denied or abridged by the United States or by any State on account of race, color, or previous condition of servitude” Its purpose was to acknowledge African American men’s voting rights.  After the passage of the 15th Amendment in 1870, African Americans were subjected to voting restrictions in certain states. Disenfranchisement of African Americans came in various forms, such as poll taxes, literacy tests, white primaries, and grandfather clauses.

Support
Julius Caesar Chappelle (1852–1904) was among the earliest black Republican legislators in the northern United States, representing Boston and serving from 1883–1886.  In 1890, Chappelle gave a political speech for the right of blacks to vote at an "enthusiastic" meeting at Boston's Faneuil Hall to support the federal elections bill. He was featured in a front page article in The New York Age newspaper covering his support of the Lodge bill.

Aftermath 
The Lodge Bill was a precursor of the various Civil Rights legislation that followed. The bill's failure led to an increase in voter suppression until Congress passed the Voting Rights Act of 1965, which was signed into law by President Lyndon B. Johnson. 

The Voting Rights Act outlawed the discriminatory voting practices adopted in many southern states after the Civil War, including literacy tests. It stated that "jurisdictions covered by these special provisions could not implement any change affecting voting until the Attorney General or the United States District Court for the District of Columbia determined that the change did not have a discriminatory purpose and would not have a discriminatory effect. In addition, the Attorney General could designate a county covered by these special provisions for the appointment of a federal examiner to review the qualifications of persons who wanted to register to vote. Further, in those counties where a federal examiner was serving, the Attorney General could request that federal observers monitor activities within the county's polling place.

See also
Henry Cabot Lodge 
 Giles v. Harris, 189 U.S. 475 (1903)
 Benjamin Harrison
Voter suppression
 Levi P. Morton
 Thomas Brackett Reed
 1892 United States presidential election

References

United States proposed federal legislation